The Betfair European Tour 2012/2013 – Event 1 (also known as the 2012 Arcaden Paul Hunter Classic) was a professional minor-ranking snooker tournament that took place between 23 and 26 August 2012 in Fürth, Germany.

Ken Doherty made the 90th official maximum break during his last 128 match against Julian Treiber. This was Doherty's first official 147 break and also the second maximum break in the 2012/2013 season. Doherty also became the first player from Ireland to make an official maximum break.

Mark Selby successfully defended his 2011 title by beating Joe Swail 4–1 in the final. Swail became the first player not on the Main Tour to reach the final of a PTC event, having been relegated the previous season.

Prize fund and ranking points
The breakdown of prize money and ranking points of the event is shown below:

1 Only professional players can earn ranking points.

Main draw

Preliminary rounds

Round 1
Best of 7 frames

Round 2
Best of 7 frames

Main rounds

Top half

Section 1

Section 2

Section 3

Section 4

Bottom half

Section 5

Section 6

Section 7

Section 8

Finals

Century breaks 

147, 103  Ken Doherty
140  Mark Williams
135, 111  Barry Hawkins
135, 107  Joe Swail
127, 116, 112  Mark Selby
122, 107  Judd Trump
121, 108  Michael White
120, 100  Joe Perry
116  John Astley
114  Martin Gould
113  Liam Highfield
112  Alfie Burden

112  Mark Allen
112  Robbie Williams
111  Oliver Lines
111  Ben Harrison
109  Michael Wild
109  Jamie Cope
108  Paul Davison
107  Mark King
104  Ryan Day
104  Kurt Maflin
104  Shaun Murphy
100  Duane Jones

References 

2012
E1
2012 in German sport